Decreolization is a postulated phenomenon whereby over time a creole language reconverges with the lexifier from which it originally derived. The notion has attracted criticism from linguists who argue there is little theoretical or empirical basis on which to postulate a process of language change which is particular to creole languages.

Overview
Decreolization is a process of language change a creole language may undergo when in contact with its lexifier. As languages remain in contact over time, they typically influence one another, especially if one holds higher linguistic prestige. In the context of creole languages, the lexifier tends to have higher prestige (though not always) and will exert a much greater influence on the creole, which has lower prestige. This leads to the reintroduction of linguistic material into the creole from the lexifier. Decreolization predicts that eventually the creole will resemble the lexifier to such a degree that it could then be called a dialect of that language rather than a separate language at all. According to Peter Trudgill, if one views pidginization as a process of simplification, reduction, and admixture from substrate languages, and creolization as the expansion of the language to combat reduction, then one can view decreolization as an 'attack' on both simplification and admixture.

Criticism 
Decreolization has been criticized by some linguists as lacking empirical and theoretical support. For example, Michel DeGraff writes:"... it has not been rigorously defined what structural process is inverted or what structural properties are removed by this decreolization process. ... What historical linguists outside of creolistics study is language change, be it contact-induced or not, and language change is a process that is presumably based on universal psycholinguistic mechanisms that do not leave room for a sui generis process of (de)creolization."In other words, as other linguists have argued, there is no a priori reason to posit a special process of language change specific to creole languages. Furthermore, it has been shown that linguistic changes resulting from contact between a creole and its lexifier do not always emerge in the way decreolization would predict. For example, changes such as grammaticalization may occur which result in the creole diverging from its lexifier.

See also
Prestige language
Cultural cringe
Language attrition
Dialect levelling
Linguistic imperialism

References

Pidgins and creoles
Theories of language
Linguistics terminology